Jacques Maloubier (23 January 1920 – 5 March 2001) was a French painter. His work was part of the painting event in the art competition at the 1948 Summer Olympics.

References

1920 births
2001 deaths
20th-century French painters
20th-century French male artists
French male painters
Olympic competitors in art competitions
Artists from New York City